This is a list of bicycle-sharing systems, both docked and dockless. As of December 2016, roughly 1000 cities worldwide have bike-sharing programs.

Bicycle sharing systems 
The following table lists bicycle-sharing systems around the world. Most systems listed allow users to pick up and drop off bicycles at any of the automated stations within the network.

Europe
The advertising company JCDecaux launched its "Cyclocity" programs initially in Vienna, Austria in 2003 and in Lyon, France in 2005. The company also started programs in other cities in Europe such as Paris, Córdoba, and Kazan, as well as cities outside of Europe, such as Brisbane, Australia. Smart cards are used to pay for use of the bikes.

Competitor Clear Channel, then operating as Adshel, opened the first example of this in Rennes in 1997, and has several other sites including Oslo, Stockholm, Sandnes and Trondheim, most generally similar to that offered by their competitor.

A different financial model called bicing is used in Barcelona, which is paid for by car owners parking on public streets and not by advertising – which is contracted to JCDecaux in some places.

France
French cities not included in the list above offering a bicycle sharing system include Lorient, Annemasse, and Aix-en-Provence.

Netherlands
In 1965, the group Provo painted fifty bicycles white and scattered them unlocked in downtown Amsterdam for everyone to use freely. The bicycles were both stolen as well as impounded by the authorities, as a city ordinance forbade leaving unlocked bikes in public places.

In September 1997, a pilot project for a public share system, based on the UK's Grippa racks was established in Rotterdam for use by commuters but it was terminated the following year due to poor functionality of the electronic bike racks.

Norway
The first Norwegian bicycle-sharing system was introduced in Sandnes in 1996. It consisted of 225 green DBS bikes that were free to use in the fashion of a first generation bicycle sharing system. The Sandnes system was converted to a third generation automated system in 2002. In 1998, Trondheim introduced a second generation system with 200 bicycles modeled after that of Copenhagen's. The Trondheim system was converted into a third-generation system in 2005.

The following cities are known to have city bike arrangements. Some are prepaid automatic (for example Oslo), and some are manual (Tønsberg). In 2001, Drammen introduced a third-generation system together with Clear Channel.

Bergen
Drammen
Oslo - Oslo Bysykkel (249 rental hubs as of April 2021)
Sandnes
Trondheim
Tønsberg

Portugal
Portugal has several bike-share systems implemented in various cities and towns. The largest is Lisbon's GIRA public bike share system, a hybrid system currently operating with 700 pedelec and conventional bicycles served by 91 stations. As of 2021, a large expansion of Lisbon's bike share system is underway, expected to duplicate both fleet and coverage. Other systems with reasonable urban coverage for the size of their operating areas are those of Vilamoura with 260 bicycles and 43 stations, Torres Vedras with 260 bicycles and 20 stations, and Vila do Conde with 60 bicycles and 12 stations. The town of Cascais with Portugal's second largest bike-sharing system has a relatively adequate geographical coverage of the municipality, but operating hours are limited (from 7 a.m. to 8 p.m.), some stations have few or no bicycles available for long periods of time, and operations were suspended during 15 months, from the onset of the COVID-19 pandemic in mid-March 2020 until June 2021, when the system was gradually reactivated. Other systems are being implemented in various towns nationwide, mostly in towns along the central and northern coastal areas  and in the Azores.

Romania
Timișoara is the first Romanian city to introduce a public rent-a-bike system. The scheme is called VeloTM and has 25 stations and 300 bikes. The rent-a-bike system works with the RATT card. Renting a bike is free; however, there is a fee for the card.

Russian Federation

Automated public bicycle sharing-services in Russia operate in Moscow, Saint Petersburg, Kazan and Almetyevsk (Republic of Tatarstan). The system in Moscow is steadily expanding each year while the systems in Saint Petersburg and Kazan are struggling to survive. The system in Almetyevsk is dockless with about 300 pre-marked parking lots across the town where the bicycles must be left after use. A couple of smaller-scale dockless systems are deployed in Adlersky City District in Sochi.

Moscow

The Velobike system debuted in 2013. In 2015 it was fully replaced by the Smoove-based solution using B'TWIN bicycles. In 2018 there were 430 parking stations in the system with 4300 bicycles. There were 424,736 registered users and 4.25 million trips taken that year.

Saint Petersburg
In 2020 the Smart Bike system was launched in Saint Petersburg.

Other cities
In 2020 Velobike opened in Murmansk, making it the northernmost bicycle-sharing system in the world. There are 10 stations in the city centre. In August 2020 Velobike opened in Nizhny Novgorod.

Mobee network
The Russian-based Mobee bike-sharing company operates a few dockless bicycle-sharing networks. As of 2019, it has opened in three cities: Sochi, Volgograd and Saratov.

Slovakia
In 2001, the not-for-profit organization BiCyBa released white bicycles into public use in Bratislava, Slovakia. During the next three months, all the bikes were stolen or destroyed and the project was cancelled.

In 2013, a new community-run bike-sharing program in Bratislava called White Bikes commenced service with about 100 bikes (donated by the local Rotary Club) and over 60 stations as of December 2017. It is built on the Open Source Bike Share System based on SMS and a web app. It was started in 2013 by BikeKitchen initiative and cycling advocacy NGO Cyklokoalicia. There is no fee; membership is granted after initial introduction and training. Bikes are available year-round.

The official Bratislava city bike-sharing system Slovnaft Bajk was launched on 7 September 2018 in cooperation with Slovnaft. It initially offered under 100 bicycles at around 80 stations. The number of bicycles increased to around 190 later, but users complained about the UX, broken bicycles, and the rental process. An estimated 23% of bicycles were non-functional or inaccessible for rental. Another free-floating bike sharing system, Rekola, from Czechia was launched in September 2020.

The first commercial bike-sharing system in Slovakia was launched in 2016 in the city of Prievidza.  (Green bicycle) has 19 stations and was expected to add 10 more in 2018. Bikes are not available during the winter season.

Public transportation company Arriva launched a bike-sharing system in Nitra in 2017. It is a complementary service for bus riders. It features seven docking stations. The price is €25 per year, €3 per day or €0.50 per hour. Bikes are not available during the winter season.

Spain

The Ayuntamiento de Burgos runs a bike-sharing program in BiciBur, with 23 locations, most with positions for ten bikes. Membership is €15 per year.

Sweden
The Stockholm City Bikes system has more than 80 stands and 1,000 bikes. The system functions from April to October.

The bike sharing system in Gothenburg, known as Styr & ställ, was launched in August 2010. The system has 60 stations and 1,000 bikes.

Switzerland 

Switzerland possesses several bicycle sharing systems including PubliBike, Smide, and oBike, which was launched in Zurich on 5 July 2017.

The PubliBike network consists of more than 500 stations and 5000 Bikes throughout the country. It includes nine stations on the Lausanne campus. oBike is said to have deployed 350 bikes in the city of Zurich at a rate of CHF 1.50 for 30 minutes, with a required CHF 129 deposit. The city of Zürich also has a free bike-rental program, "Züri rollt", with several pick-up and drop-off locations.

United Kingdom

England 
In 1993, a Green Bike Scheme bike sharing programme was initiated in Cambridge, United Kingdom, using a fleet of some 300 bicycles. The overwhelming majority of bicycles in the fleet were stolen or missing within a year of the programme's introduction, and the Green Bike Scheme was abandoned.

In an attempt to overcome losses from theft, bike sharing programmes adopted a so-called 'smart technology'. One of the first 'smart bike' programmes was the Grippa™ bike storage rack system used in Portsmouth's Bikeabout scheme. The Bikeabout scheme was launched in October 1995 by the University of Portsmouth, UK, as part of its Green Transport Plan in an effort to cut car travel by staff and students between campus sites. The Bikeabout scheme was a "smart card" fully automated system. For a small fee, users were issued 'smart cards' with magnetic stripes to be swiped through an electronic card reader at a covered 'bike store' kiosk, unlocking the bike from its storage rack. CCTV camera surveillance was installed at all bike stations in an effort to limit vandalism. Upon arriving at the destination station, the smart card was used to open a cycle rack and record the bike's safe return. A charge was automatically registered on the user's card if the bike was returned with damage or if the time exceeded the three-hour maximum. Implemented with an original budget of approximately £200,000, the Portsmouth Bikeabout scheme was never very successful in terms of rider usage, in part due to the limited number of bike kiosks and hours of operation. Seasonal weather restrictions and concerns over unjustified charges for bike damage also imposed barriers to usage. The Bikeabout program was discontinued by the university in 1998 in favour of expanded minibus service; the total costs of the Bikeabout programme were never disclosed.  Following the discontinuation of the University of Portsmouth's Bikeabout programme in 1998 (it had been launched in 1996), the introduction of new bicycle share systems proceeded more slowly in the United Kingdom than in the rest of Europe.

In 2007, (another source gives early 2008) London mayor Ken Livingstone promised that an extensive bicycle sharing system modelled on the Paris Vélib' system would be introduced in London during his final term in office. The scheme was not completed until Boris Johnson was in office, and consequently became known informally as "Boris Bikes". With initial sponsorship from Barclays and later Santander, Transport for London launched the scheme in 2010. Hire under 30 minutes is free from special bicycle stands across the city, after a daily, monthly, or annual charge has been paid.

Outside London, the largest bicycle-sharing scheme is the hire-a-bike operation in Blackpool, operated by Hourbike, with 60 stations and 500 bikes. This scheme uses both RFID membership cards and instant point-of-sale memberships for both residential users and visitors. Hourbike also has schemes in Lincoln, Reading, Liverpool, Nottingham, and Southport in England as well as Dumfries, Scotland.

In 2017, ofo, a Beijing-based bike share company, announced plans to provide shared bike services to several British cities. In 2018, the company withdrew service to several British towns and reduced service area coverage to others as part of a global restructuring plan.

In May 2017, Bristol became the first European city to have a hire-a-bike system operated by YoBike.

Some bike-sharing schemes use mobile phone apps to reserve or sign out bikes. In the UK, OYBike ran small-scale operations at two universities, three business parks, three London boroughs, and a private hotel chain in London until 2011.  Like Munich's Call-a-Bike, OYBike used mobile phone technology to log use and charge for hires and could set up hire points in as little as 10 minutes.

Brompton Bike Hire has 40 docks across 25 major locations in the UK, starting at £2.50 for 24 hours. It uses the same hardware as BIXI Montréal, and members can rent a folding Brompton bike. The locations of the docks include London, Birmingham, Manchester, Bristol, Reading, Southampton, and Oxford.

In 2018 the Singaporean-based company oBike launched in London, with 400 dockless bikes and was anticipated to spread to other cities in the UK. In the UK, oBike's bike hire is 50p for 30 minutes, with a required £49 deposit.

In June 2019, bicycle light company Beryl launched a dockless cycle share scheme in Bournemouth and Poole, which was extended to Christchurch the following year. Beryl also operates schemes in Hereford, Norwich, Watford and the Isle of Wight.

In June 2021, Transport for Greater Manchester announced Beryl as the delivery partner to design, install and operate a 24/7, docked public cycle hire scheme made up of an initial 1,500 bikes and e-bikes at over 200 docking stations across Manchester, Trafford and Salford, in Greater Manchester. The scheme was scheduled to launch in November 2021.

Northern Ireland 
Belfast launched a public bike hire scheme on 27 April 2015. The scheme was sponsored by Coca-Cola HBC Northern Ireland and is called Coca-Cola Zero Belfast Bikes. The Department for Regional Development (DRD) provided initial capital funding for the scheme as part of their Active Travel Demonstration Projects budget. NSL oversees the daily operation of the scheme, while Nextbike is responsible for the bikes. There are 33 docking stations with options for expansion depending on securing additional resources and council approval.

Scotland 

Recent expansions to cities in Scotland included Glasgow and Stirling. Stirling's scheme was named "Pedalforth" following a competition in the community and comprises 100 bikes and 11 stations. Glasgow was provided with 400 bikes across 31 stations in 2014. In addition to this, in 2018, Edinburgh launched its own cycle hire scheme in partnership with Just Eat, titled Just Eat Cycles.

Wales 
Cardiff

Nextbike started a public bike hire scheme operating in Cardiff on 26 March 2018, with five docking stations and 50 bicycles. The original plan was to have the public bike hire scheme operating in Cardiff by Autumn 2017 and to have 500 cycles at over 50 docking stations in the city. It came six years after OYBike ended a smaller scheme (with 10 stations), following the council's withdrawal of funding in 2011.

Swansea

Santander began a bike sharing scheme in Swansea in the summer of 2018. Initially, there were five docking station, with a sixth later being added in Mumbles. The scheme has proven popular and there are prospects of expanding the service in the city.

North America

Canada

Montréal, QC

The first widely deployed bicycle sharing system in Montréal was BIXI Montréal, launched in 2009. It expanded to 6200 bicycles at 540 stations, making it the largest bicycle sharing system, alongside the one in Toronto. Although initial program costs were $15 million for planning and implementation of the Bixi project, subsequent expenses incurred in expanding the program have driven costs upwards of $23 million. The system was developed by PBSC Urban Solutions along with a consortium of vendors. The BIXI technology was later used in bike sharing systems in North America, Europe and Australia. The Montreal system was ranked by Time magazine as the 19th best invention of 2008. As of 2022, Bixi has 7 270 regular bikes, 2 395 pedal assist bikes and 794 stations.

Hamilton, ON
Sobi Hamilton launched in March 2015 with 750 bicycles at over 100 stations.

Ottawa, ON
The Bixi system was implemented in June 2009 in Ottawa/Gatineau as Capital Bixi. It launched in 2009 as a pilot program with 100 bicycles and 10 stations. In 2012, it was expanded to 250 bicycles and 25 stations. Its owner, the NCC, sold it to US-based CycleHop in April 2014 when its operator, Montreal-based Public Bike System Company, filed for bankruptcy protection in January 2014. CycleHop renamed the service to VeloGo and replaced the fleet with 'smart' bicycles, where GPS tracking is built into each bicycle, instead of relying on base stations, as with Bixi system. VeloGo began its service in the summer of 2015.

Toronto, ON
From 2001 to 2006, BikeShare, operated by the Community Bicycle Network (CBN) in Toronto, was for a time the most popular community bicycle sharing program in North America. BikeShare was intended to overcome some of the theft issues by requiring yearly memberships to sign out any of the 150 refurbished yellow bikes locked up at 16 hubs throughout central Toronto. At its height, over 400 members could sign out a bike from any hub for up to three days. The hubs were located at stores, cafes, and community centres where the staff would volunteer their time to sign bikes out and in. Despite steadily increasing administrative, implementation, and maintenance costs, CBN could only charge users around 20 percent of actual costs, as users were unlikely to spend more than $50 per year for a membership. Without sufficient funds in the form of private and government grants, CBN discontinued BikeShare in 2006.

Bixi Toronto launched in 2011 with 800 bicycles at 80 stations. In 2013, when Public Bike System Company acknowledged that it could not repay its $3.9 million loan to the city, the system was taken over by the Toronto Parking Authority and renamed Bike Share Toronto. In 2016, the city of Toronto signed a contract with PBSC to expand their system. Its network hosts 6,850 bicycles spread among 625 stations.

Vancouver, BC
In July 2016, Vancouver installed a bike sharing system, Mobi, operated by CycleHop Corp. Mobi launched with 1500 bicycles at 150 stations.

Victoria, BC
In September 2017 a dockless bike share became available in the city of Victoria, starting with 150 bicycles. The dockless bike share was operated by U-Bicycle, but disappeared from the city's streets after a couple of years.

Edmonton, AB
From 2005 to 2008, a largely unregulated bike sharing program was operated by the Peoples' Pedal organisation in Edmonton, Alberta. The program suffered from high theft and vandalism rates, with 95% of the bikes that had been placed into service stolen or missing by 2008.

Costa Rica
Cartago, east of San José, Costa Rica, started a bikeshare program in 2017.

Mexico

Mexico City

Ecobici is one of the world's largest bicycle-sharing programs, with 452 stations covering a  area.

In February 2010, the government of Mexico City inaugurated a bicycle sharing network called Ecobici. With distinctive red and white liveried bicycles, the network as of February 2015 consists of 444 stations with 6,500 bicycles. With more than 240,000 registered users, it has been argued that Ecobici is the largest bicycle-sharing program in North America. 
The system is run by the private company Clear Channel México, but funded by the government with an initial investment of 75 million pesos. Users of the system are required to purchase an RFID card at a cost of 400 pesos which provides them with access to the bicycles for one year. Use of a bicycle is free for the first 45 minutes; extra charges are applied for use beyond the time limit.

Guadalajara
In December 2014, the government of the State of Jalisco implemented a bicycle sharing system called MiBici with 86 stations and 860 bicycles. As of August 2021, it has 300 stations with 3,200 bicycles. This system uses the technology and the hardware of PBSC.

Toluca
In November 2015, the Municipality of Toluca inaugurated a bicycle sharing system called Huitzi with 26 stations and 300 bicycles, using PBSC as a provider.

Pachuca
In February 2016, the Municipality of Pachuca inaugurated a bicycle sharing system called Bici Capital with six stations and 140 bicycles.

Puebla
Beginning in January 2017, Puebla was scheduled to have a system called Bici Puebla with 139 stations and 2,100 bicycles.

United States
In the United States, public bicycle share programs have largely centered around major cities and universities. Some corporate campuses have private systems. According to a report by the National Association of City Transportation Officials, a total of 35 million bike-share trips took place within the United States in 2017 across 100 bike-share systems across the country, operated by eight companies. Seattle led the way with a dockless bike sharing system in the U.S. in the summer of 2017, and other cities soon joined the ranks. Nine months later, about 44% of rides were dockless. The bikes became controversial in various cities; Dallas reportedly had 20,000 bikes on the streets, they were essentially banned in New York City and San Francisco, with Austin, Texas issuing emergency rules for their implementation.

Bikes Belong (Dem/Rep Conventions), 2008 
In 2007, Bikes Belong (now known as PeopleForBikes), an advocacy group financed by major bicycle manufacturers, worked with city officials, local advocates, and the healthcare firm Humana to bring bike sharing to the Republican and Democratic 2008 conventions.  Called "Freewheelin!" the program offered 1,000 bicycles at 12 stations throughout the downtowns of the host cities, Denver and Minneapolis/St. Paul, over the five days of each convention. Bikes Belong's stated goal was to provide a proof-of-concept that large-scale bicycle sharing that had gained popularity in European cities could work in U.S. cities and provide a valuable addition to the transportation mix. The program was popular among conventioneers and helped the city of Denver to create a narrative around the "green" attributes of the convention. Both Denver and Minneapolis successfully pursued permanent bike sharing systems, with Denver B-cycle launching on 22 April 2010 as the first of its scale in the U.S., followed by Minneapolis' NiceRide system launching on 10 June 2010.

Aspen/Basalt, CO 
The system was launched in 2013 with 16 stations and 200 bikes with provider PBSC.

Albany, NY 
In 2017, CDPHP Cycle! launched in Albany and three other Capital region cities. The bikes can be locked to official docks or any other rack for a slightly higher fee. The system is operated by CDTA.

Alpharetta, GA
Alpharetta offered a bike share program operated by Zagster. Trips under three hours were free, and annual memberships were $20. Bikes could be rented from four stations throughout Alpharetta. Bikes could be taken anywhere, including Alpharetta's Big Creek Greenway– a 12-foot wide concrete path that stretches eight scenic miles terminating in Big Creek park. The service was suspended late May 2020 due to a large-scale Zagster shutdown, and all bicycles and stations were removed.

Atlanta, GA
In June 2016, Relay Bike Share launched as the bike share system for the City of Atlanta. The program, operated by Cyclehop and Social Bicycles, launched with 100 bicycles at 10 stations throughout the downtown area. The program aimed to offer 500 bicycles across the city by the end of 2016.

Austin, TX
In December 2013, Austin B-cycle was launched as the bike share system for the City of Austin with 11 stations. Austin B-cycle set a national bike share record for the most checkouts per bicycle in a single day, 10.1 checkouts per bike, on 14 March 2015 during the SXSW festival. In July 2020, Capital Metro and the city of Austin finalized a partnership to improve Austin's mobility network utilizing the city-owned BCycle bike share system. This partnership, now called Metrobike, aims to create long-term bike share service improvements such as expanding the BCycle fleet and stations, optimizing the system's first and last-mile transit solution, improving services and reaching communities outside of the downtown core, and fully electrifying BCycle's fleet. As of March 2022, the MetroBike system operated more than 75 bike share stations with 800 bikes in the central Austin area.

Baltimore, MD 
In May 2014, over 40 bicycles were stolen from Baltimore Recreation and Parks department's bike-share program. The bikes were stolen during the city's Ride Around Reservoir program in Druid Hill Park. The bikes were set up to be lent out when a group of youths took them. The cost of replacing the stolen bikes is devastating to the program, which operates completely on donations.

Birmingham, AL
Birmingham launched Zyp Bikeshare in October 2015. Annual memberships are $75, with monthly passes for $20, 3-day passes for $12, and daily passes for $6. Zyp also offers discounted annual memberships to individuals who qualify. Zyp operates 400 bikes at 40 kiosks. Bikes can be ridden anywhere in the downtown Birmingham area. Once a bike is unlocked, riders have 45 minutes to ride before incurring additional fees if they have not docked at another station.  As well as traditional bikes, Zyp was the first bike share in North America to have electric pedal-assist bikes to help riders cover distances or mount hills faster.

Boston, MA

In 2007, Boston Mayor Thomas M. Menino and Director of Bicycle Programs, Nicole Freedman, decided to bring bike sharing to the Boston area.  The Metropolitan Area Planning Council, the regional planning agency for the metro-Boston region of 101 cities and towns, joined the effort.  Brookline, Cambridge, and Somerville also participated. 

On 28 July 2011, Boston launched its 60-station, 600-bike Hubway system, sponsored by the shoe manufacturer New Balance and funded in part by a $3 million grant from the Federal Transit Administration. The contract to operate was awarded to Alta Bicycle Share  and the equipment provider was PBSC Urban Solutions. Bicycle-sharing was greeted with a mix of excitement and skepticism. In its first two and a half months, Hubway recorded 100,000 station-to-station rides. After recording 140,000 trips in four months, Boston's European-style bicycle-sharing system expanded outside city limits, planting stations across Cambridge, Somerville, and Brookline.

In the spring of 2018 Motivate the operator of the system changed sponsors from Hubway to the Blue Cross Blue Shield Association and officially changed the name of the bike share program to Bluebikes Boston. As of December 2018, the system had deployed 262 stations with a fleet of over 2,500 bikes.

Boulder, CO

In May 2011, Boulder, Colorado launched a bicycle sharing system, Boulder B-Cycle, with 100 bicycles and 15 stations. Like many in northern latitude cities, this system closes down during winter months to help preserve the life of the equipment.

Broward County, FL
Broward B-Cycle launched in December 2011 as the country's first county-wide bike share program, with 200 bikes and 20 stations located in several cities within Broward County, including Fort Lauderdale. This system was funded through a public-private partnership with the Florida Department of Transportation providing a $311,000 grant through Broward County, and B-Cycle's sponsors providing the remainder of the initial capital and operating costs.

Buffalo, NY
Reddy Bikeshare launched in 2016 with 200 bicycles at 35 stations around the city.

Charleston, SC
In August 2013, the College of Charleston's Office of Sustainability began a bike sharing program. This program's 16 bicycles are free to use for all full-time students, faculty, and staff members.

Charlotte, NC
A system of B-Cycle stands is installed downtown and in a few places nearby.

Chattanooga, TN
In July 2012, the Bike Chattanooga Bicycle Transit System launched in Chattanooga, Tennessee with 300 bikes and 28 solar-powered stations by PBSC. It was the first large scale bicycle transit system in the Southeast. The system has expanded to 33 stations and had recorded over 78,000 trips by its second anniversary.

Chicago, IL

On 28 June 2013, Chicago launched Divvy, a bike share system with 750 bikes at 75 stations. As of September 2021, the system operates 16,500 bikes at over 800 stations, using both PBSC's hardware and software.

Cincinnati, OH
In September 2014, Cincinnati Red Bike started operation. It opened with 35 docking stations downtown, Over the Rhine, the University of Cincinnati's main campus, and surrounding areas. In 2015 Red Bike expanded to 50 stations with over 300 bikes and has a ridership of 100,000+ per year.

Cleveland, OH
On 21 September 2016, Cleveland launched its UH Bike system, with 250 bicycles and 22 stations distributed around the city.

Columbia, SC

In September 2018, Columbia launched BlueBikeSC with BlueCross BlueShield SC being the chief sponsor. In March 2019, the regions transit authority, The Comet (transit) expanded the bike share system adding 10 stations to the system with a $250,000 grant from the federal transit authority.

Columbus, OH
On 30 July 2013, CoGo Bike Share started in Columbus, Ohio. It opened with 300 bikes and 30 docking stations in downtown and surrounding areas, all provided by PBSC and operated by Motivate.

In the summer of 2015, Zagster launched a 115-bicycle, 15-station system on the Ohio State University campus. The university decided not to integrate with the city's CoGo system. The Ohio State University announced plans to integrate electric assist bicycles as part of its bicycle share program launching in 2015. The Zagster program at Ohio State University shut down in August 2018.

Denver, CO
On 22 April 2010, Denver became the first U.S. city with a large-scale smart-technology-enabled bicycle sharing system with the launch of Denver B-cycle. The system launched with 45 stations and 450 bicycles throughout downtown, downtown-adjacent neighborhoods, and on higher-education campuses. Denver B-cycle's roots came from the "Freewheelin" bike sharing program which operated for 6 days during the 2008 DNC convention in Denver. In Denver, several B-cycle rental stations are located at RTD Light Rail Platforms. The Denver B-cycle program varies in cost depending on use. Fees range from $8 per day to $80 per year.

Denver's B-cycle needed  months to reach 100,000 station-to-station rides.

Des Moines, IA
B-Cycle has partnered with the Des Moines Bicycle Collective, operating bike-sharing stations throughout the downtown core, East Village, Ingersoll, Sherman Hill, and Drake University neighborhoods. The system is in operation from 1 March - 30 November each year.

Detroit, MI
Mogo, a nonprofit affiliate of the Downtown Detroit Partnership launched MoGo Bike Share in the Greater Downtown area with 430 bicycles across 43 stations on 23 May 2017.

Eugene, OR
PeaceHealth Rides is administered by JUMP Bikes (formerly Social Bicycles, and now owned by Uber) and is a partnership of the City of Eugene, Lane Transit District, and the University of Oregon. The system launched in downtown Eugene, the Whiteaker neighborhood, and the area around the University of Oregon with 300 bicycles across 36 stations in April 2018. PeaceHealth, a not-for-profit Catholic health system with 10 hospitals in three states including one hospital in Eugene, is the sponsor.

Fargo, ND
In March 2015, bicycle advocacy nonprofit Great Rides Fargo launched Great Rides Bike Share, a system with 101 bicycles at 11 stations. The system was launched in partnership with North Dakota State University, where students are enrolled at no additional cost. It was the first system to include integrated card access for enrolled students.

Fort Wayne, IN
In April 2016, The city of Fort Wayne announced a small system in its downtown area.

Fort Worth, TX 
On 22 April 2013, Fort Worth Bike Sharing, a 501(c)3 non-profit organization, launched a B-cycle system consisting of 300 bikes and 30 stations serving Downtown, Near Southside, and Cultural District in Fort Worth, Texas. Fort Worth B-cycle is included in a program called "B-connected" which allows members of over 15 participating B-cycle cities to use their annual memberships for free in other cities.

Greenville, NC
The City of Greenville and nearby Farmville launched the bike share system LimeBike in early 2018. It serves citizens as well as students of East Carolina University.

Harrisburg, PA
The City of Harrisburg launched the Harrisburg Bike Share in late 2017 with 55 bikes through Zagster. 93% of the proceeds benefitted a state nonprofit to prevent school dropouts. In June 2020 the bike share program was shut down when Zagster ceased operations across the country.

Honolulu, HI
The City and County of Honolulu passed Bikeshare Resolution 14–35 on 14 March 2014. Bikeshare Hawaii, a local non-profit, operating as "Biki", started in June 2017 with about 100 stations and 1000 bicycles. During the first partial year, NACTO ranked Biki as the 8th most-ridden bike share service in the US. Biki reached 1 million rides after about 16 months of service. A 30% service expansion was undertaken in December 2018. The current service area extends from Iwilei to Waikiki / Diamond Head and mauka of H-I highway with about 1300 pedal bikes and over 130 stations. Biki had its first >100,000 ride month in October 2018 and had over 1 million rides during 2018. NACTO ranked Biki as the 6th most-ridden bike share service in the US for 2018. Biki chose PBSC's FIT model bicycle for its accessibility (lower weight and lower center of gravity), and as such has a much higher ratio of women riders (44%) than most US systems. Additionally, there is currently an independent small pilot program in Kailua (Hawai`i County) with three stations also utilizing PBSC equipment. This program received an additional small expansion grant in 2018.

Indianapolis, IN
On April 22, 2014, Indianapolis launched a public bike-share program called Indiana Pacers Bikeshare with 25 stations and 250 bikes. On 5 September 2019, the program expanded to include 21 more stations and 275 more bikes, bringing the program total to 525 bicycles and 50 stations.

Jersey City, NJ
On 21 September 2015, the Citi Bike system that started in New York City in 2013 expanded across the Hudson River to Jersey City, New Jersey with 35 stations and 350 bikes. Even though Citi Bike Jersey City is independent of Citi Bike New York, one membership works for both systems. The system experienced its first wave of expansion in July 2016 with 15 new stations and 150 additional bikes. The system currently boasts 50 stations with 500 bicycles throughout Jersey City.

Kansas City, MO
In 2012, Kansas City, Missouri launched Kansas City B-cycle in partnership with Blue Cross Blue Shield. The system currently has 30 stations and over 200 bicycles reaching downtown, Union Hill, Westport, Plaza and as of Summer 2015, Brookside Trolley Trail. North Kansas City will be adding 3 more stations in spring 2017 as well as several more coming to Midtown KCMO.

La Crosse, WI 
On 20 April 2021, Drift Cycle was launched with 40 bikes at 8 stations in downtown La Crosse. In 2022, the system was expanded and improved with new bikes, a new app and two new stations at the University of Wisconsin-La Crosse and Gundersen Health System. With the relaunch on 21 April 2022, there are ten stations and 50 bikes.

Los Angeles, CA
On 7 July 2016, Los Angeles County launched Metro Bike Share, a 1,400-bike system with equipment by B-Cycle, operated by Bicycle Transit Systems. It was the first North American system to be both branded as part of the public transit agency and accessible using the regional TAP card, though at the time of launch users were required to maintain separate accounts for each transit mode and pay separate fares.

Lincoln, NE 
On 20 April 2018, BikeLNK was launched and as of 2019, is made up of 105 bicycles and 20 stations. The program has recorded over 70,000 trips in 18 months of usage.

Madison, WI 
In 1996, Madison, Wisconsin, instituted its Red Bikes Project, a public bike sharing program. These red-painted bicycles were available for the use of the general public, primarily in the student areas of State Street between the University of Wisconsin campus and the Wisconsin State Capitol. Initially, the only rule regarding the use of a Red Bikes Project bicycle was that it was required to remain outside and unlocked, and thus available for any passerby. After a surge in bicycle thefts and vandalism, the program was modified to require a valid credit card and $80 in security deposits for both the bicycle and the now-mandatory bicycle lock. The program is now only available seasonally, from spring (when all snow has melted) to 30 November.

Manhattan, KS 
In 2015, the Green Apple Bikes bike-share system started in Manhattan, Kansas that makes single-speed cruisers available free for 4-hour periods. The program is funded by a consortium of businesses, and bicycles are maintained by volunteers.

Memphis, TN
On 23 May 2018, Explore Bike Share launched in Memphis, TN, and West Memphis, AR. The system was launched with 60 stations and 600 bicycles serving portions of West Memphis, Downtown Memphis, Uptown Memphis, Midtown Memphis, South Memphis, and Orange Mound, with a plan to add another 30 stations and 300 bicycles in 2019. The system uses B-Cycle equipment.

Miami and Miami Beach, FL
In March 2011, DecoBike launched in Miami Beach, Florida. The initial rollout of the program included "approximately 100 solar-powered stations and 1,000 custom-designed bikes available to residents and visitors." This public bicycle sharing and rental program is owned and operated by DecoBike, LLC, a Miami-based company, and operates under a long-term agreement with the City of Miami Beach. The service is available to both residents and visitors: any adult with a major credit card can check out a bike to pedal to their next location. An iPhone app and an interactive map on the DecoBike website allow one to locate the nearest "station" and displays the number of bikes available and the number of free docking spaces in real time.

Milwaukee, WI
In August 2014, the City of Milwaukee in partnership with a local non-profit organization, Midwest Bike Share, launched Bublr Bikes with 10 stations in downtown Milwaukee. The system grew to 17 stations by Fall 2015, and now there are 50 stations in the City of Milwaukee plus another 7 stations in the adjacent suburb of Wauwatosa(as of December 2016).  Planning for additional stations within the City of Milwaukee is underway.  Additionally, the adjacent communities of Shorewood and West Allis are expected to add around 7 stations each to the system in 2017.  In May 2019 a project to add an additional 26 stations to the existing 87 was announced, with plans to have the additional stations online by summer 2020.

Minneapolis, MN
In June 2010, Minneapolis initiated Nice Ride, one of the first examples of a large-scale municipal bike sharing program in the United States. Phase 1 included 700 bikes and 65 stations throughout Minneapolis Due to popularity, the system was aggressively expanded into neighboring Saint Paul in 2011. As of 29 April 2012, Nice Ride had recorded a total of 330,000 trips, and a systemwide total of 1,330 bikes at 146 stations. The system is provided by PBSC.
Minneapolis, Nice Ride needed six months to reach 100,000 station-to-station rides.

New Paltz, NY
The village of New Paltz, New York, home of SUNY New Paltz, has a bicycle lending program.

New York City, NY

On Memorial Day, 27 May 2013, New York City started its privately funded Citi Bike program. It was the nation's largest when it began operation, but Washington, D.C.'s system has grown faster. It began with 6,000 bikes at 330 docking stations in Manhattan and parts of Brooklyn. According to the city vision OneNYC the city wants to expand it to 12,000 bikes and 750 docking stations in Manhattan, all of Brooklyn and Queens
. By 29 May, on its third day of operation, the program had 21,300 individuals signed on as annual members.  Citi Bike is the largest bike sharing program in the United States. In August 2015, Citi Bike once again became the largest system in the United States with 400 stations. Jump Bikes, a dockless electric bicycle sharing system launched in the city in September 2017.

Oklahoma City, OK
On 18 May 2012, the City of Oklahoma City launched its bike share program known as Spokies. On 1 August 2014, Spokies became part of EMBARK, Oklahoma City's transit agency. The system has eight docking stations and 145 bikes throughout downtown Oklahoma City.

Philadelphia, PA

On 23 April 2015, the City of Philadelphia launched its privately funded Indego bike share program with 60 docking stations and 600 bikes, located in Center City, South Philadelphia, Northern Liberties, and University City. It used equipment by B-Cycle and was operated by Bicycle Transit Systems with a naming sponsorship from locally based health insurer Independence.

Phoenix, AZ
On 25 November 2014, Phoenix launched Grid Bike Share with 100 bikes at 27 stations. It has since expanded to nearly 500 bikes at 48 stations and has plans to add another 200 bikes and 20 stations. Mesa, AZ, joined the system in March 2016, with 100 bikes at 14 stations, with plans to add another 200 bikes and 10–14 stations. Tempe, AZ, intends to join the three-city system in early 2017 with 300 bikes at 31 stations. In early December 2020, GRID announced the closure of the Bike Share program on 31 December 2020

Pittsburgh, PA
On 31 May 2015 Pittsburgh, during an Open Streets day, launched its Healthy Ride bike share program. The system launched with 50 docking stations and 500 bikes located in Downtown Pittsburgh, South Side Flats, North Shore, Strip District, Lawrenceville, Oakland, Bloomfield, and Shadyside.

Portland, OR
One of the first community bicycle projects in the United States was started in Portland, Oregon in 1994 by civic and environmental activists Tom O'Keefe, Joe Keating, and Steve Gunther. It took the approach of simply releasing a number of bicycles to the streets for unrestricted use. While Portland's Yellow Bike Project was successful in terms of publicity, it proved unsustainable due to theft and vandalism of the bicycles. The Yellow Bike Project was eventually terminated, and replaced with the Create A Commuter (CAC) program, which provides free secondhand bicycles to certain preselected low-income and disadvantaged people who need a bicycle to get to work or attend job training courses,

On 19 July 2016 Portland launched Biketown, a system with 1,000 GPS-enabled smart bikes sold by Social Bicycles and operated by Motivate with a $10 million, five-year naming sponsorship by Nike. It was the continent's largest smart-bike system at the time of launch. The 100 stations covered 8.1 square miles but were concentrated most densely in downtown Portland and the Pearl and Northwest Districts. Funding came entirely from a $2 million allocation of federal dollars approved by the Metro regional government, from Nike, and from ongoing user fees and smaller sponsorships.

Salem, MA
In 2011, the city of Salem, Massachusetts launched a bike share program called Salem Spins, offering the use of bicycles free of charge, for use around the city. The seasonal program was financed in part with a $25,000 grant for a fleet of 20 bicycles. The program was offered from April to October until June 2020, when the city's private bike share partner Zagster shut down.

Salt Lake City, UT
On 8 April 2013, Salt Lake City launched GREENbike as the region's Bike Share brand. The program launched in downtown Salt Lake City with 10 stations and added two new stations less than four months later. The program will be expanding to 20 stations by 2014 with the goal of 100 stations in downtown Salt Lake City. Satellite GREENbike systems in cities such as Ogden are in the works and will be connected by the state transit authority's Frontrunner light rail train.

San Diego, CA
Though the City of San Diego signed a 10-year contract with Discover (formerly DECO) Bike in 2013, a docked bike-share, in January 2018 the city attorney Mara Elliot opined that the city's contract did not preclude other companies from operating within city limits, as long as there were "no city support or participation, other than legally required reviews and approvals."  Ofo and LimeBike began operating on 15 February 2018. As of March 2018, Ofo, LimeBike, and Mobike offered dockless bike rentals within the city. LimeBike and Bird offer electric scooters, and LimeBike offered electric pedal-assist bikes as well. However, there have been some concerns in high-pedestrian corridors.

Due to a breach of contract (according to the city of San Diego), the City of San Diego withdrew the operations permit for the Discover Bike in March 2019 and thus ended docked bike share service in the city.

San Francisco / Bay Area, CA 

In August 2013 the Bay Area Bike Share system began operating in the San Francisco Bay Area of California. The system allocated half of its 700 bicycle fleet in San Francisco, and the rest along the Caltrain corridor in Redwood City, Palo Alto, Mountain View and San Jose. In 2015, it was announced that the scheme would expand to 7,000 bikes, over 2016–2017, and would include the East Bay Area communities of Berkeley, Emeryville, and Oakland.

Seattle, WA
On 13 October 2014, Pronto Cycle Share launched with 500 bicycles and 50 stations. Pronto uses Motivate of New York City as the operator.  In January 2017, Seattle's mayor announced the system would be permanently shut down at the end of March 2017 due to funding shortfalls. Dockless systems by LimeBike and Spin were introduced in July 2017 as their first large-city systems in the US.

Stony Brook, NY
In April 2013, Stony Brook University launched the Wolf Ride Bike Share system with four stations and 48 bicycles. As of November 2015, the system consisted of 12 stations and 78 bicycles.

Topeka, KS
On 15 April 2015, Topeka Metro Bikes launched with 100 smart bikes and 10 stations. An additional 100 bikes were added to the system in April 2016. The program shut down in July 2020, and all 300 bikes were subsequently sold at auction. A local non-profit purchased the bikes, modified them to remove the electronics, and gave them to members of the community on a first-come, first-served basis.

Tucson, AZ 
In 1996, a pilot bicycle share project known as the Orange Bike Project was organised in Tucson, Arizona by Bootstraps to Share, a homeless advocacy organisation inspired by the Bikes Not Bombs movement. Using funds from a government grant to obtain, recondition, and maintain 30 bicycles, project organisers announced plans to station the bicycles in downtown Tucson and areas adjacent to the University of Arizona. The publicly shared bicycles, painted bright orange by Earl Scheib to identify them, were primarily intended for use by the homeless or those without means of affordable transportation. The initial 30 bicycles placed into service for the Orange Bike Project were all stolen within a few weeks. A total of 80 bicycles were eventually used in the Orange Bike Project, all of which were either stolen or vandalised beyond repair. In one case, an Orange Bike Project bicycle was thrown in front of a freight train, in others, bikes were found with major frame damage consistent with deliberate vandalism. The program was terminated after only five months of operation.

Tulsa, OK
The Tulsa Townies bicycle project was launched in August 2007 by Saint Francis Health System. This project is the first bicycle program of its kind in northeastern Oklahoma. As of 2016, the bicycle rental stations were located at the Tulsa River Parks trail along Riverside Drive at 19th and 41st streets and in Jenks at the 96th street Arkansas River pedestrian bridge.

Washington, D.C., northern Virginia and suburban Maryland
In Washington, D.C., the privately operated bike-sharing project SmartBike DC opened for service in 2008 in the District of Columbia with 10 stations and 120 bikes. Operated by the advertising firm Clear Channel Outdoor, the system was funded by advertising revenues from bus shelters on public streets, along with revenues from user membership and usage fees.  The program suffered from perennially low membership and rider usage rates, as well as a limited number of bike rental stations.  It was officially terminated in January 2011. 

On 20 September 2010, Arlington County, Virginia and the District of Columbia launched the U.S.'s first public-private partnership bike share system, Capital Bikeshare (CaBi), which replaced SmartBike DC. Unlike SmartBike, CaBi is a public taxpayer-supported (local government and federal funds) bicycle sharing program. The initial scheme involved some 1,100 bicycles at 100 stations located throughout the District of Columbia and parts of Arlington County, Virginia. The cost of planning, implementation, and administration for Capital Bikeshare totaled US$5.0 million, with first-year operating costs of US$2.3 million for 100 stations.
CaBi was operated by Alta Bicycle Share (now Motivate International) with equipment from Montreal-based PBSC Urban Solutions. Capital Bike Share was the largest bike sharing system in the United States until May 2013.

As of 2017, Washington, D.C. had four dockless bike-share systems.

Wauwatosa, WI
In June 2017, the city of Wauwatosa, Wisconsin partnered with Zagster to incorporate an adaptive bike-share station into their existing Bublr network. It was thought to be the first adaptive bike-share station in Wisconsin, and the dual partnership is thought to be the first of its kind in the United States.

California
In California, many cities have launched or have stated plans to launch their own bike-sharing programs, including the cities of Anaheim (as of 2012, 10 bikes and 1 station, with plans for 100 bikes and 10 stations), Los Angeles (as of 2012, plans for 4000 bikes at 400 stations), Santa Monica (as of 2012, plans for 250 bikes at 25 locations), and San Diego. The San Francisco Bay Area's Bay Area Air Quality Management District, in partnership with Alta Bike Share, city governments, and transportation authorities, announced plans for a pilot regional sharing program in 2013 for the San Francisco Peninsula and San Jose.

In the fall of 2009, the University of California, Irvine introduced its Zotwheels automated bike share program. Students and university employees may sign up for a Zotwheels membership card at an annual cost of $40, which enables the user to check out a bike from any bike station located throughout campus for a maximum of three hours and drop it off at any other station. A $200 charge is imposed for a lost, stolen, or severely damaged bike. Bicycle availability and station operational status may be determined using an interactive map. Revenues from membership fees are sufficient to offset only a small fraction of the total operating costs of the program; all remaining manufacture, installation, maintenance, and implementation costs of the Zotwheels systems and the bicycles themselves are borne by UCI. Zotwheels was developed as a collaboration between the UCI Parking and Transportation Services, The Collegiate Bicycle Company, CSL Ltd, and Miles Data Technologies.

In January 2018, e-bike provider Jump Bikes launched in San Francisco, becoming the first dockless bicycle-sharing system to launch in the city.

ofo offers a partnership program with universities to provide sustainable campus transportation. On 21 February 2018, ofo and Pomona College in Claremont, California launched the first college pilot program in California.

South America

Argentina

Rosario
On 2 December 2015 Rosario launched Mi bici tu bici, which had 200 bicycles available at 18 rental stations downtown.

San Lorenzo
In November 2016, San Lorenzo launched Biciudad, a free-to-use bike sharing system. The system was launched by the San Lorenzo Government to reduce the use of motor vehicles and enhance means of non-motorized transport.

The Biciudad Bike Sharing System is expanding along with the construction of a circuit of exclusive lanes for bicycles across the city.

Brazil
Bike Itaú is a public bicycle sharing system in the city of Rio de Janeiro, Brazil.  It is run by PBSC Urban Solutions and started on 20 February 2018, and is sponsored by the municipal government of Rio de Janeiro in partnership with Banco Itaú.  The system replaces the old one operated by Serttel, a private concessionaire, that began operations in October 2011.

A similar scheme was implemented in the city of São Paulo on 24 May 2012, called Bike Sampa. It is free up to the first hour of use, after which users are charged R$5 every 30 minutes. There are about 140,000 registered users and, as of 6 May 2013, there had been 220,000 bicycle trips in the city.

Other cities with similar bike sharing systems are operated by Serttel: Brasília, Belo Horizonte, Salvador, Porto Alegre, Santos, Recife, Belém, Manaus, Fortaleza, Vitória and Aracaju. Fortaleza's bike sharing system, named , has the highest relative use in Brazil. With 800 bikes and 80 stations, the system registers 6.4 trips per bike on workdays as of 2015.

Chile 

There are three separate bike-share systems in the metropolitan area of Santiago, the capital city of Chile: Bikesantiago, Bici Las Condes, and Mobike.

The commune of Providencia, part of the Santiago de Chile metropolitan area, implemented a public bike-share system named B'easy and started services in August 2008 with a monthly membership of 1000 Chilean Pesos (US$2) and four stations.

Santiago Metropolitan Area 
Bikesantiago started its services in October 2013 in the metropolitan commune of Vitacura with 30 stations, 300 bicycles, and a monthly membership of 4990 Chilean pesos (US$8). By November 2015, it had 25000 subscribers, 132 stations, and 1882 bicycles in the communes of Lo Barnechea, Vitacura, Providencia (Replacing the original B'easy system), Santiago, Ñuñoa, Recoleta and Independencia and had contracts for a programmed expansion in a total of 14 communes, 200 stations and 2100 bikes in the Metropolitan Area of Santiago.

Las Condes 
Bici Las Condes is the communal bike-share system of Las Condes, part of the Metropolitan Area of Santiago. It began service in March 2015 with a total of 50 stations and 500 bikes and had a planned expansion to a total of 100 stations and 1000 bikes. The decision of the Las Condes municipal council to not join the Metropolitan area tender for an interconnected bike-sharing system was controversial.

Colombia 
The EnCicla Bike Share System in Medellín is operated by the metropolitan area of Aburrá Valley. EnCicla is integrated with the city's existing infrastructure of cycle routes, mass transit, and public transport systems.

Ecuador 
In August 2012 the Municipality of Quito government established a municipal bicycle sharing system called Bici Q. The Municipality of Cuenca implemented a public bicycle sharing system in 2013. Bici Q is free and available for anyone with a membership card, which can be obtained online or in person.

Uruguay 
The Movete Bike Share System in Montevideo is integrated with the city's existing infrastructure of cycle routes, mass transit and public transport systems.

Asia

Bangladesh
JoBike is a bicycle sharing system serving the cities of Dhaka, Chittagong and Cox's Bazar. Launched in 2018, it is the first such system in Bangladesh.

China

Initially, a number of traditional (third-generation) docked public bike systems operated by local municipal governments opened across China, with the largest ones being in Wuhan and Hangzhou. The first was introduced in Beijing in 2007.  However, third-generation bike sharing has not been considered successful in the majority of cities in China. Bike sharing in Beijing virtually stopped and also encountered difficulties in Shanghai and Wuhan.

In 2014, students from Peking University created a company called ofo and initialize the fourth generation bike sharing system in their campus. In 2017, a number of private competing app-based dockless bike-sharing programs have started to appear in numerous cities across China. The two largest dockless operators are Mobike and Ofo, others include Bluegogo and Xiaoming. Many Chinese cities saw massive growth in the number and use these dockless bike share programs, clogging sidewalks around major commercial hubs and subway stations with parked bikes. Given the speed of growth with these services, local governments did not have any regulations or planning to accommodate these systems. However the Chinese government encourages the development of dockless bikes to reduce urban pollution. Early studies in Beijing and Shanghai have linked the massive increase of dockless bike shares to the decrease in the number of private automobile trips that are less than five kilometres. In Guangzhou, the arrival of dockless bike shares had a positive impact in the growth of cycling mode share.

Beijing

A municipal scheme in Beijing was launched in 2012 with the stationing of 2,000 bikes in the Chaoyang district. The scheme was scheduled to consist of 20,000 rental bikes and 500 kiosks, according to the Beijing Municipal Commission of Development and Reform. The main operating area was to be in business districts and near subway stations and major public venues. By 2015, authorities intended to have 50,000 bikes available, similar to the Hangzhou scheme that was used as a model. This development followed the failure of a scheme launched in 2005–2006 (ahead of Velib) and in the light of a 2011 announcement by the Beijing Municipal Commission of Transport that it expected to raise the bike share of urban commuter journeys from 20 to 23 percent by 2015.

In March 2017, Beijing saw over 200,000 dockless shared bikes from various companies enter service. The bikes are accessible via an app, and typically cost around 1 RMB per hour plus a refundable damage deposit of 299 RMB. Aside from the dockless bicycles, an existing municipal-run, dock-based bike network has 86,000 bikes. The Beijing municipal government pledged to improve management and parking availability in response to the rapidly growing fleets of dockless bikes. Beijing cycling rates increased from 5.5% to 11.6% after the arrival of the dockless bike systems.

Shanghai
In preparation for the 2010 World Expo in Shanghai, China, Shanghai launched a limited bike share programme accessible through RFID cards. Users could purchase 100-ride credits for about $30. Short rides are rewarded credits and longer rides subtract credits once the bikes have been re-docked. Shanghai planned to expand to 3,500 Bicycle Hot Spots throughout the entire city by 2010. Two years after the World Expo, Shanghai's bicycle sharing programme was mostly limited to the Minhang District.

The Shanghai Bike Authority estimated that there are 280,000 shared bikes in Shanghai by March 2017, with a projected increase of 220,000 bikes by June. In March 2017, the government in Shanghai requested a temporary ban on the introduction of new private "dockless" shared bikes. Shanghai prepared regulations restricting the age of riders to between 12 and 70 and mandating the removal of bikes that have been in service for more than three years in a row. Mobike alone operates 100,000 bikes in Shanghai and has claimed to have made Shanghai into the city with the world's largest bike share network.

Haikou
Beginning around 2017, Haikou, the capital of Hainan province, experienced a massive increase in the number of dockless bikes by Ofo, Mobike, and Quick To. The Haikou Public Bike System, a traditional municipal-run docked system, has about 20,000 bicycles.

Wenzhou 
Wenzhou has multiple bike share programs serving different districts of the city. The first one opened in 2012, serving Lucheng District with about 5,000 bikes and 180 stations. In 2013, a bike share with 2,200 bikes and 66 stations opened in Longwan District. At the same time, a separate bike share program with 1,040 bikes and 32 stations opened in Ouhai District. The latter of the two was being expanded to 3,250 bikes and 109 stations as of 2017. According to local government records, more than 20,000 dockless bikes from various private bike share companies had entered service in Wenzhou as of 2017.

Guangzhou
Guangzhou Bus Rapid Transit has a bike share program integrated around its stations. According to the local government, in 2017, Guangzhou had a fleet of over 700,000 bikes in various public and private bike share programs. On average 4 million trips each day were made using shared bikes. The local government is reviewing traffic management strategies and road design standards to accommodate the increase in cycling traffic.

Guilin
In 2014, Guilin City opened a docked bike sharing system with 3,000 bikes spread out over 100 stations.

Hangzhou
The Hangzhou Public Bicycle bike-sharing system has 60,600 bikes and was started in 2008. Bike-sharing stations can be found in Hangzhou every 100 metres. The first hour of use is free, followed by 1 yuan ($0.15) for the first hour, 2 yuan the second hour, and 3 yuan for each subsequent hour. In 2013 USA Today called the Hangzhou bike-sharing system the 'best in the world'. A March 2010 survey of Hangzhou Public Bicycle members and non-members found that 30% of users incorporated bicycle sharing into their most common commutes. Furthermore, the bicycle sharing system captured modal share from bus transit, walking, autos and taxis. Another key finding from the survey suggested that car ownership may not reduce the likelihood of bike sharing use. In fact, members of the Hangzhou system exhibited a higher rate of auto ownership in comparison to non-members.

Before the arrival of private dockless systems, Hangzhou was the largest bike share system in the world until it was overtaken by Wuhan. In 2011, the system had 2,050 bike-share stations with a fleet of over 50,000 bikes and serving 240,000 trips per day. By 2015, it was expanded to over 84,000 bikes and 3,354 stations.

Nanning
Since December 2013, Nanning has had a bicycle sharing system with 1000 bicycles and 50 stations. The first hour of usage is free, and afterward it costs 2RMB/h. By 2014, it was expanded to about 25,000 bikes and 896 stations.

Ningbo 
A municipal docked bike share program opened in 2013 with 7,500 bikes and 300 stations. By 2015, it was expanded to 30,000 bikes spread over 1,240 stations across the city.

Quanzhou 
A municipal docked bike share program, operated by Taiwan-based YouBike, opened in 2016 with over 200 stations and a fleet of 6,000 bikes. As of 2017, it was being expanded to 410 stations with over 18,000 bikes.

Shaoxing 
In 2011, a 1,500-bike, 26-station bike sharing system opened in Shaoxing. In 2012, it was expanded by 2,000 bikes and 50 stations.
Suzhou
The Suzhou Industrial Park has a bicycle sharing system (苏州工业园区公共自行车) with 1,880 bicycles and 72 stations, which launched in January 2012.

Xi'an
Since 2011, Xi'an has had a bicycle sharing system with 8,000 bicycles and 375 stations. By 2016, it was expanded to 52,000 public bicycles and 1,800 stations.

Lanzhou
In 2014, a bike sharing system was created around downtown Lanzhou with 377 stations.

Kunming
A municipal docked bike share program opened in 2015 with 5,000 bikes and over 700 stations. In 2017, the system was expected to consist of 2,500 bike stations as far south as Chenggong District and approximately 45,000 bicycles.  Kunming expects to expand its bicycle-sharing system to 6,500 stations by 2019.  Bicycles are free for the first hour, 0.5 yuan for each additional half hour, and 15 yuan for an entire day.

Hong Kong
Major bicycle-sharing operations in Hong Kong include ofo, Hoba Bike, Ketch'Up Bike, LocoBike, and oBike.

The first dockless bike sharing provider in Hong Kong, Gobee.bike, launched in April 2017 but terminated in July 2018.

Plans were announced by Cleantech Solutions in 2017 to enable users to rent bikes from multiple providers, by providing an app with a centralised list of available bicycles across all providers.

Iran

Tehran 
In July 2016, the first Iranian modern public bike system was designed and established in Urmia city with 250 bikes in 20 stations by ASI company under the brand name "U Bike".

India

Mumbai 
Mumbai operates two bicycle-sharing schemes, and as of 2011 the Ministry of Urban Development was preparing to launch a 10-city public bike scheme as part of its "Mission for Sustainable Habitat".

Mysuru (Mysore) 
Mysore was the first Indian city to initiate cycle sharing in 2009. As of 2009, it had 28 locations and 52 planned locations.

Ahmedabad 

A MyByk cycle sharing program in Ahmedabad started with eight stations in the city in 2013. Subscribers can keep bicycles as long as required without having to return them.

New Delhi 
The Delhi Metro Rail Corporation (DMRC) launched a software-based Public Bicycle Sharing (PBS) scheme through which commuters can rent cycles from a residential area and travel to the nearest Metro station and then rent a cycle from a departing Metro station for use in nearby localities.

Bhubaneswar 
In 2018, a Public Bicycle Sharing (PBS) system was launched in Bhubaneshwar. The bikes included Hexi bikes, Yana and Yulu, and comprised 2000 bikes overall.

Pune 
Many bicycle sharing systems started in Pune. One system was initiated by PedalSaddle, providing cycles for rent for cheaper than public transportation. In January 2018, Chinese bicycle-sharing company Ofo launched a dockless bicycle-sharing services in Pune.

Other cities 
Bicycle-sharing systems are used in other cities including Rajkot, Bhubaneswar, Vadodara (Baroda), Ranchi, Surat, Udaipur, Jamnagar and Panchkula.

Indonesia
Bike2Work
Bike2Work has operated as a bicycle-sharing network since 2004. As of 2015, it has 130 branches across Indonesia, including in Jakarta.
Bandung 
Bandung municipal government operates 30 stations with 270 bikes, called Boseh Bikesharing.
 Jakarta
Gowes, which means "to paddle" in Indonesian, started operation in limited areas of Jakarta in 2018.

Israel
Tel-Aviv

Tel-O-Fun, started in 2011, is a bicycle sharing program in Tel-Aviv with 2,000 bicycles and 200 stations throughout the city and in some surrounding towns.

Japan
According to the Ministry of Land, Infrastructure, Transport and Tourism as of 2012, there were a number of city-level pilot schemes in operation in Japan, the largest of which was in Tokyo's Edogawa City with 500 cycles available for hire. Toyama also has a bicycle sharing system, that takes the region's public transit IC card Passca.

Kazakhstan
Astana-Bike in the capital Astana, has 200 bikes in 40 stations, and 1000 bikes for Expo 2017.

Shymkent-bike in Shymkent, 200 bikes in 44 stations.

Almaty-bike in Almaty, September 2016.

Malaysia

George Town 

LinkBike in George Town, Penang commenced operations in December 2016 with 60 bicycles, making it the first city in Malaysia to introduce a public bicycle-sharing system. This service has since been expanded to 250 bicycles and 25 stations throughout George Town, covering destinations between Gurney Drive to the north and Queensbay Mall to the south.

Kota Kinabalu 
In March 2017, the Kota Kinabalu City Hall implemented a bicycle sharing service with 20 bicycles initially made available. Users of the service were required to have a City Hall 'touch and go' card with RM200 (U$45) as a deposit to use a bicycle for 24 hours. The deposit was refunded when the bicycle was returned. Its stations are available in major hotels in the city as well as in Tanjung Lipat and in front of the Grace Court apartment in Sembulan, with another 150 bicycles available in stores.

Klang Valley 
The  LRT/KTM station was selected for a bicycle sharing system from the Singaporean company oBike in 2017. Riders were to be charged RM1.00 per 15 minutes of usage.

South Korea

Seoul 

Following trials, a bike-sharing system named Ddareungi was introduced in Seoul in October 2015 in select areas on the right bank of the Han River. After a few months, the number of stations reached 150 and 1500 bikes were made available. In 2016, the number of stations increased to cover new districts. As of July 2016, there were about 300 stations and 3000 bikes available, and Seoul mayor Park Won-soon confirmed his intention to increase the number of bikes available to 20,000.

Daejeon

Taiwan

National systems 

YouBike is the largest bicycle-sharing service in Taiwan. Launched in Taipei City in 2009 and expanded through cooperation between the Taipei City Government and Taiwanese bike manufacturer Giant, the system saw 22 million rentals in 2014, double the 11 million rentals in the previous year.

Singaporean dockless bicycle-sharing platform oBike launched in Taiwan in April 2017 under the management of Taiwan's Aozhi Network Technology Co., Ltd. The parking of the bikes in public areas such as sidewalks and motorcycle parking spaces caused controversy. The service has shut down in June 2017, with all the bikes left on street.

Kaohsiung 
The southern city of Kaohsiung launched the country's first bicycle-sharing service, CityBike, on 1 March 2009 with 20 stations and 1,500 Merida bikes. The service has been replaced by YouBike 2.0 since July 2020.

Turkey

Public bike sharing services in Turkey use the Baksi system. In Istanbul, the system called İsbike, which was launched in 2012, has 140 stations and 1,500 bikes. In İzmir, the Metropolitan Municipality launched a system called Bisim in 2014. It had 40 stations and 550 bikes as of 2020.

Similar systems are operational in Antalya, Eskişehir, Kayseri, Kocaeli, Konya, and Samsun.

United Arab Emirates 

ADCB Bikeshare scheme operates in the nation's capital city of Abu Dhabi, and is sponsored by Abu Dhabi Commercial Bank. ADCB Bikeshare launched in December 2015. Run by Cyacle, the programme operates on Yas Island and Al Raha Beach, where there are 11 stations with 75 bicycles available for hire. In the first eight months of operation, 5,641 people became members of the scheme and rode 78,689 kilometres (48,895 miles) on 8,536 trips.

The German bike sharing company Nextbike temporarily also operated a bike sharing scheme in Dubai, but apparently discontinued it.

Australasia

Australia 
A number of Australian cities have had docking shared bike systems since 2010. In 2017, dockless bike sharing commenced in all the capital cities. The dockless systems experienced a higher degree of vandalism, including bikes dumped in rivers, than in other countries.  The dockless services all provided helmets with the bikes.

Docked systems

Melbourne Bike Share (MBS) was the first municipal bicycle share system in Australia, launched in Melbourne in June 2010. It started with 10 stations. Usage was lower than expected and has required ongoing public subsidy. Take-up was affected by the location of docking stations and the legal requirement for riders wear helmets, which are not provided with the bikes. Ridership doubled when $5 helmets were offered for sale from vending machines. The MBS used 500 cycles at about 50 stations around Melbourne's central business district before it was shut down in November 2019.

Newcastle's central business district launched an e-bike share scheme on 21 May 2018, including 19 docking stations with 100 electric bikes. The bike scheme was launched as a partnership between the operator BYKKO, and Transport for NSW. An initial pilot program funded with $2000AUD of council grant money was conducted, though evidence of the evaluation does not appear to be posted publicly. After speaking with the local newspaper, BYKKO said the aim of the project is to complement the existing public transport system.

The Brisbane CityCycle, operated by JCDecaux, started on 1 September 2010 and has grown to include 2000 bikes in 150 stations. Its operation has depended on public subsidy. Initially, helmets were not provided with the bikes, but this was later changed. After only achieving 80,000 trips in its first twelve months , this increased to 522,388 in the 2016-17 financial year.

Dockless systems

In 2017 dockless systems were launched in a number of Australian cities.
Sydney
 Airbike launched in Adelaide, Canberra, and Sydney.
 oBike has placed 1,000 bikes since July 2017.
 Reddy Go started with 1,500 bikes, also in July 2017, and has expanded to over 2,000 bikes. The company exited Sydney in July 2018, citing "red tape".
 Ofo launched with 600 bikes in October 2017. In July 2018 Ofo announced it was leaving Australia.
 Mobike distributed up to 500 bikes in November 2017.

Melbourne
 oBike placed 1,250 bikes in Melbourne since July 2017. There was vandalism of the bikes in the first few months, including some being dumped in the Yarra River.

Perth
 Urbi bike-share began a 12-month trial operating within the City of Joondalup in September 2017.

Adelaide
Ofo distributed 50 bikes throughout North Adelaide in October 2017. In July 2018 Ofo announced it was leaving Australia.

Airbike launched in Adelaide.

Brisbane

Subscriptions for CityCycle, a Vélib-style community bike hire scheme by JCDecaux for Brisbane started on 1 September 2010 and has grown to include 2000 bikes in 150 stations from the University of Queensland to Tenerife. Its operation has depended on public subsidy. Initially, helmets were not provided with the bikes but this was later changed. After logging only 80,000 trips in its first twelve months, by 2016-17 this had increased to 522,388.

The bikes were linked to the public transport go card – a single card covering all buses, trains, ferries, and the Gold Coast light rail system. In 2017 it was announced new bank card facilities would be added to the stations.

After ten years of operation, the hire scheme's decommission was announced for 2021. Throughout 2021, CityCycle stations were removed to make way for shared e-bikes.

Gold Coast
Mobike started with 200 bikes around Surfers Paradise and Broadbeach in February 2018 with the number expected to grow to 2,000 by the time of the Commonwealth Games in April. Mobike was granted exclusive rights to operate bike sharing by the local council and will partner with Transit Australia Group and Good Cycles.

New Zealand 

In both Auckland and Christchurch, Nextbike provides some limited cycle sharing facilities; plans are in hand to expand these. The New Zealand Transport Agency is working with Auckland Transport and the Christchurch City Council respectively to investigate cycle sharing schemes for each city. Independently, a private consortium proposed having a scheme in place in Auckland in 2017.

Onzo NZ is the first and largest dockless bike sharing platform to launch in New Zealand, beginning in Auckland in late 2017, and in Wellington in 2018.

Universities

Canada
 University of British Columbia, Vancouver – Purple and Yellow Bikes

India
 Indian Institute of Science, Bangalore – NammaCycle
 Birla Institute of Technology, Mesra, Ranchi -Desi Wheels
 Indian Institute of Technology, Bombay – Zoomcar PEDL

Jordan
 Jordan University of Science and Technology, Irbid – Darajty (دراجتي)

Mexico
 National Autonomous University of Mexico, Mexico City – Bicipuma

United Kingdom
Several cycle hire schemes in UK towns and cities overlap their university areas, e.g. the one at Stirling. Others, e.g. Leeds, offer longer-term cycle hire. Kingston University is reported to have a scheme called KU Bikes that was due to begin in early 2018, while Derby anticipates that Hourbike will run a scheme in Derby operating electric bikes, around the same time.
 University of Nottingham, Nottingham – Ucycle

United States

 Belmont University, Nashville, Tennessee – Belmont Bikes
 California State University, East Bay, Hayward, California – Zagster (service cancelled)
 College of Charleston, Charleston, South Carolina – Bike Share
 Cornell College, Mount Vernon, Iowa – Purple Bikes
 Cornell University, Ithaca, New York – Big Red Bikes
 Duke University, Durham, North Carolina – Zagster
 Emory University, Druid Hills, Georgia – Bike Emory
 Florida State University, Tallahassee, Florida – ReCycle Program
 Georgia Institute of Technology, Atlanta, Georgia – viaCycle@GT
 Hamilton College, Clinton, New York – Gilded Bicycle Guild (founded in 2006, returned spring 2012)
 Hampshire College, Amherst, Massachusetts – Yellow Bike Program
 Harvard University, Cambridge, Massachusetts – CrimsonBikes
 Illinois State University, Normal, Illinois – Reggie Ride
 Keene State College, Keene, New Hampshire – Green Bike Program
 Kent State University, Kent, Ohio – Flashfleet
 New York University, New York City – NYU Bike Share
 Northern Arizona University, Flagstaff, Arizona – Yellow Bike Program
 Oakland University, Rochester, Michigan – OU Bike Share
 Occidental College, Los Angeles, California – Bike Share
 Ohio State University, Columbus, Ohio – Buckeye Bikes
 Olin College, Needham, Massachusetts – GO Bikes
 Otterbein University, Westerville, Ohio – Otterbike Program
 Pennsylvania State University, State College, Pennsylvania – Zagster (until all bikes and stations were removed in June 2020)
 St. Olaf College, Northfield, Minnesota – Green Bikes
 Saint Xavier University, Chicago, Illinois – Green Bike
 Santa Clara University, Santa Clara, California – Zagster
 Southwestern University, Georgetown, Texas – Pirate Bike Program
 Stony Brook University, Stony Brook, New York – Wolf Ride – PBSC
 University of California, Irvine, Irvine, California – Zotwheels (automated bike share program, inaugurated Fall 2009)
 University of Chicago, Chicago, Illinois – recycles
 University of Cincinnati, Cincinnati, Ohio – UC Bearcats Bike Share
 University of Kentucky, Lexington, Kentucky – Wildcat Wheels,
 University of North Carolina at Chapel Hill, Chapel Hill, North Carolina – Tar Heel Bikes
 University of Pennsylvania, Philadelphia, Pennsylvania – PennCycle
 University of South Florida, Tampa, Florida – Borrow Our Bikes Program
 University of Tulsa, Tulsa, Oklahoma – Yellow Bikes
 University of Vermont, Burlington, Vermont – B.U.G. Bike Share
 Trinity College (Connecticut), Hartford,CT – Bantam Bike
 Washington State University, Pullman, Washington – WSU Green Bike Program – PBSC (operated by WSU Wellbeing, inaugurated in Fall 2009)
 Yale University, New Haven, Connecticut – Zagster until indefinite shutdown as of May 2020

See also

 Alternatives to the automobile
 Bicycle sharing system
 Carsharing
 Collaborative consumption
 Outline of cycling
 Scooter-sharing system
 Sustainable transport

Notes

References

 
Cycling-related lists
Road transport-related lists